David G. Lee (born March 31, 1942) is an American retired professional basketball player. He was a small forward who played two seasons in the American Basketball Association (ABA) as a member of the Oakland Oaks (1967–68) and the New Orleans Buccaneers (1968–69). Born in Modesto, California, Lee attended the University of San Francisco where he was drafted during the seventh round (59 pick overall) of the 1964 NBA Draft by the San Francisco Warriors, but he never played for them.

External links

1942 births
Living people
American men's basketball players
Basketball players from California
New Orleans Buccaneers players
Oakland Oaks players
San Francisco Dons men's basketball players
San Francisco Warriors draft picks
Small forwards
Sportspeople from Modesto, California